Karukutty is a village panchayat in Aluva Taluk, Ernakulam district of Kerala, India. Classified as a Grade A panchayat, Karukutty comprises 17 wards and falls under Angamaly block panchayat in Aluva taluk. It is part of Angamaly Assembly constituency and Chalakudy Parliament constituency.

History

Located on the southern border of the erstwhile Cochin kingdom, Karukutty has been influenced by the cultures of both Travancore and Cochin kingdoms and has been cited in ancient Portuguese records. Remnants of an old fort, referred to locally as Kottathendu (കോട്ടത്തെണ്ട്), can be seen here. The fort - Nedumkotta (നേടുംക്കോട്ട) was built jointly by the Travancore and Cochin kingdoms to resist invasions by Tipu Sultan. Numerous other artifacts and vessels used by natives to store their treasures and valuables have also been excavated. There is a popular saying that goes "Karukutty kandaal maru kutty venda" (കറുകുററി കണ്ടാല്‍ മറുകുററി വേണ്ട). It roughly translates to "If you have reached Karukutty, then you need not go looking elsewhere" – a sign of the self-sufficient and prosperous nature of the locality.The name karu kutty means Dark fortress.

Geography

Spread over an area of 33.57 km² in central Kerala, the terrain is primarily of five types - plain land, valley, high land, sloped terrain and hilltops.

Borders
East: Mookkannoor panchayat
North: Chalakudy River and Koratty panchayat
West: Parakkadavu panchayat
South: Angamaly municipality

References

External links

 Official site of Karukutty Panchayat

Villages in Ernakulam district
Suburbs of Kochi